Monteagle County is one of the 141 Cadastral divisions of New South Wales.

Monteagle County was named in honour of Thomas Spring Rice, 1st Baron Monteagle of Brandon (1790-1866), a former Chancellor of the Exchequer.

Parishes within this county
A full list of parishes found within this county; their current LGA and mapping coordinates to the approximate centre of each location is as follows:

References

Counties of New South Wales